Luis Rosendo Ramos Maldonado (born 6 September 1957) is a retired road bicycle racer from Mexico, who twice won the men's individual road race at the Pan American Games: in 1983 and 1987. He represented his native country at the 1976, 1984 and 1988 Summer Olympics.

References

External links

1957 births
Living people
Mexican male cyclists
Cyclists at the 1976 Summer Olympics
Cyclists at the 1984 Summer Olympics
Cyclists at the 1988 Summer Olympics
Cyclists at the 1983 Pan American Games
Cyclists at the 1987 Pan American Games
Olympic cyclists of Mexico
Place of birth missing (living people)
Pan American Games gold medalists for Mexico
Pan American Games medalists in cycling
Medalists at the 1983 Pan American Games
Medalists at the 1987 Pan American Games
20th-century Mexican people
21st-century Mexican people